White Bluff Power Plant is a base load coal-fired power station in Redfield, Arkansas with a nameplate capacity of 1,800 MW and a net summer capacity of 1,638 MW.

In 2018, Entergy announced it will close the plant by 2028.

Emissions
In 2013, Environment America ranked the plant 42 on its list of the 100 dirtiest coal-fired power stations in the U.S., reporting that its 2011 emissions were equivalent to 2.16 million passenger vehicles.

The plant released 10,250,228 metric tons of greenhouse gases in 2012 according to the EPA. The emissions in metric tons comprised:

Carbon dioxide: 10,172,525
Methane: 24,688
Nitrous oxide: 53,015

See also

 List of power stations in Arkansas

References

External links
Chimney Diagram
 Data on generation and fuel consumption from the Energy Information Administration Electricity Data Browser

Energy infrastructure completed in 1980
Towers completed in 1980
Coal-fired power stations in Arkansas
Buildings and structures in Jefferson County, Arkansas
Towers in Arkansas
Chimneys in the United States
1980 establishments in Arkansas
Entergy